The 2003 Marlboro Masters of Formula 3 was the thirteenth Masters of Formula 3 race held at Circuit Park Zandvoort on 10 August 2003. It was won by Christian Klien, for ADAC Berlin Brandenburg.

Drivers and teams

Notes

Classification

Race

See also
 2003 Formula 3 Euro Series season
 2003 British Formula 3 season

References

Masters of Formula Three
Masters of Formula Three
Masters
Masters of Formula Three